Minerva was a Belgian firm active from 1902 to 1938 and a manufacturer of luxury automobiles. The company became defunct in 1956.

History
In 1883, a young Dutchman, Sylvain de Jong (1868–1928) settled in Antwerp, Belgium.

Bicycles and motorcycles

Minerva started out manufacturing standard safety bicycles in 1897, before in 1900 expanding into light cars and "motocyclettes", particularly motorized bicycles which were a forerunner of motorcycles.

They produced lightweight clip-on engines that mounted below the bicycle front down tube, specifically for Minerva bicycles, but also available in kit form suitable for almost any bicycle. The engine drove a belt turning a large gear wheel attached to the side of the rear wheel opposite to the chain. These kits were exported around the world to countries including the United Kingdom, France, Germany, the Netherlands, Australia, and other British territories of the time.

As engine power increased, frame ruptures became increasingly common, and by 1903 Minerva had developed an in-frame design for their bicycles, with the engine mounted above the bottom bracket, while still also offering the clip-on kit. From 1904 Minerva began focussing more on car production, and while development and production of the Minerva motorized bicycles and motorcycles continued through to about 1909, they increasingly became a less significant part of the company.

Minerva engines exported to the UK powered the very first Triumph, among others. 
Motorcycle production would continue until 1909 or 1914, and during this period Minerva became one of the world's premier names in motorcycles and motorcycle engines. (For instance Chater-Lea produced Minerva-engines in the UK.)

Automobiles

In 1902 De Jong added cars to his production as well with a 6 hp four-cylinder model. In 1903 he founded Société Anonyme Minerva Motors in Berchem (Antwerp). Volume car production began in 1904 with a range of two-, three- and four-cylinder models with chain drive and metal clad wooden chassis and the Minervette cyclecar. The 8-litre Kaiserpreis won the Belgian Circuit des Ardennes race in 1907.

Charles S Rolls (of future Rolls-Royce fame) was a Minerva dealer in England selling the 2.9-litre . The most important market for the manufacturer remained England, where at £105 the small 636 cc single-cylinder Minervette was the cheapest car on the market, followed by the Netherlands and France.

In 1908, Minerva obtained a worldwide Knight Engine license. The Knight motor, developed by Charles Yale Knight in the United States, used double sleeve valves and ran almost silently. All future Minervas would use these engines. Sporting successes continued with the new engines including the Austrian Alpine Trials and Swedish Winter Trials. Customers for the Minerva would include kings of Belgium, Sweden and Norway, Henry Ford and the Impressionist Artist Anna Boch.

During World War I Sylvain de Jong and his engineers were based in Amsterdam where they  maintained development of their automobiles. Minerva cars were used for hit and run attacks against the Germans initially with rifle fire and light machine guns from simply protected open topped vehicles. These vehicles became increasingly sophisticated until trench warfare robbed them of the mobility needed for their hit and run tactics.

In 1920, they returned to Belgium to restart the production of luxury cars  with the 20CV 3.6-litre four-cylinder and 30CV 5.3-litre six-cylinder models.  The manufacturer's star rose not only in Europe, but in the United States as well where American film stars, politicians and industrialists appreciated the cars. The Minerva had the same quality as the Rolls-Royce, but was slightly less expensive. In 1923, smaller models were introduced; the 2-litre four-cylinder 15CV and 3.4-litre six-cylinder 20CV with standard four-wheel brakes. In 1927, the 30CV was replaced with the 6-litre AK and also a new 2-litre six, the 12-14, was introduced. Large cars continued to be a specialty of Minerva's, and in 1930 the then almost-compulsory-for-the-time straight eight was introduced in two sizes; the 6.6-litre AL and the  4-litre AP. The last Minerva was the 2-litre M4 of 1934 but it did not sell well.

With the financial crisis in the 1930s, the company was restructured as Société Nouvelle Minerva but in 1934 merged with the other major Belgian manufacturer Imperia. Imperia continued to make Minervas for a year and the AP until 1938 and from 1937 badged some of their cars and trucks for export to England and France as Minerva-Imperias. Just before the outbreak of the war, a group of businessmen from Verviers bought out Minerva.

Land Rover production

After World War II the company produced a version of the Land Rover 80" under licence for the Belgian army up to 1954. The 80" model was known as the TT (Tout Terrain). A smaller number of licence built Land Rover 86" were built from late 1953 to 1956. These vehicles had locally built steel bodywork. Some civilian sales of both the 80" and the 86" models were achieved. A number of Land Rover vehicles were also assembled for the Belgian state police (Gendarmerie / Rijkswacht).  The Rijkswacht vehicles had the more traditional aluminium bodywork and front wing shape associated with Land Rover vehicles. A bitter dispute broke out between Land Rover and the Minerva company and this led to a court case, won by Minerva for breach of contract.  This was the death knell of the partnership and licence arrangement.  After the deal with Land Rover fell apart there were plans to re-enter the car market but these did not get beyond the prototype stage. The company struggled for survival and made the Continental-engined Land Rover-like C20 until 1956.

Name revival in 2013
In 2013, a concept car was presented with the name Minerva J.M. Brabazon. This was a drawing only.

References

Notes

Further reading

External links

Minerva Cars
'Minerva Motor Car Company': fan page
Dutch Land Rover Register: Minerva: Het is groen en het komt uit België (It's green and it comes from Belgium) – a history of Minerva and its licence-built Land Rovers 
Royal Veteran Car Club Belgium: Les Constructeurs Belges par Daniel Absil – a history of Belgian car manufacturers, including Minerva

See also
List of motorcycles of 1900 to 1909
Excelsior Motor Company (UK)

Luxury vehicles
Cars powered by Knight engines
Car manufacturers of Belgium
Defunct motor vehicle manufacturers of Belgium
Vintage vehicles
Companies based in Antwerp
Belgian brands
Cyclecars
Motorcycle manufacturers of Belgium